Jambulingam 3D is a 2016 Tamil language 3D adventure comedy film that was directed by Hari & Harish.  The film released on 13 May 2016 in India and stars Ambuli Gokulnath and Anjena Kirti in the lead roles.

Filming for Jambulingam 3D took place extensively in Japan.

Synopsis 
When a young woman's daughter is captured, it's up to Jambulingam (Ambuli Gokulnath), a magician's apprentice, to rescue her.

Cast 

 Gokulnath as Jambulingam / Jumbo
 Anjena Kirti as Irene
 Ashvin Raja as Maanasthan
Sandy
 Sukanya as Sadhana
 Erode Mahesh as Sagunam 
 Baby Hamsika as Hamsi
 Yog Japee 
 Kalairani
 Lollu Sabha Jeeva
 Gowthami Vembunathan

Soundtrack 
The songs of the film was composed by Srividya and lyrics written by Harish Raghavendra and Gangai Amaran.

Reception
The Hindu wrote a critical review for Jamulingam 3D, stating that it was "silly and dull" and commenting that while it was aimed at children rather than adults "If any of them should enjoy this film though, I think we should all be justified in feeling concerned over the future of our world." The Times of India was equally dismissive, writing "Even on paper, the premise of Jambulingam feels thin, and on screen, it looks even worse. The film has been shot in 3D, but given how flat and unexciting the staging is, the 3D makes no difference; in fact, it only hurts the eyes."

References

External links
  

2010s Tamil-language films
2016 films
Films shot in Japan
Films set in Japan
Indian adventure comedy films
Indian 3D films
2016 3D films
2010s adventure comedy films
2016 comedy films